The Johner Brothers were a Canadian country music duo from Midale. They won more than 40 awards from the Saskatchewan Country Music Association, including Entertainer of the Decade in 1999.

History
Brothers Ken Johner and Brad Johner grew up in Saskatchewan playing music in their family band. In 1988, they teamed up together to form The Johner Brothers. In 2000 the pair took home a Prairie Music Award for their video and production skills.

The duo signed with Warner Music Canada and released their first album, Some Kind of Magic, in 1991. Two singles from the album reached the Canadian country singles chart, including the top 40 "Right On Time." That same year, the Johner's won four awards at the Saskatchewan Country Music Awards (SCMA), including Group of the Year, Single of the Year, Song of the Year, and Most Promising. They were also named Group or Duo of the Year by the Canadian Country Music Association.

In 1992, The Johner Brothers won seven awards from the SCMA, including Entertainer, Group, Duo, Song, Single and Album of the Year. They released their second studio album, My Brother and Me, in 1993. Seven singles from the album found their way to the Canadian country singles chart, including the top 20 hit "Starting Right Now", and their duet with Lisa Brokop, "Light In My Life." The duo won another four awards at the 1993 SCMA Awards, including Entertainer, Group and Single of the Year.

The Johner Brothers became one of only a few Canadian country music acts to release a Christmas album with the release of 1993's One Winter's Night. 1994 proved to be a banner year for the Johner's, when they won no less than 11 awards from SCMA. Among their wins were Entertainer, Group, Song, Single, Video and Album of the Year, along with Vocal Collaboration of the Year for their duet with Lisa Brokop.

Their success continued in 1995 with the release of their third album, Ten More Miles. The album charted 5 singles, including the Top 25 songs "Hillbilly Country Boy" and the title track. They racked up another 7 awards at the SCMA Awards the same year, including their fourth straight win as Entertainer of the Year, and their fifth as Group of the Year. Their television special One Winter's Night also won an SCMA Award for TV Show of the Year.

The Johner Brothers took some time off before the release of their fourth studio album, The Perfect Life, in 1999. That same year, they were named Entertainer of the Decade by SCMA. As a condition of their win, that was their only honour from the SCMA for the year. They continued to rack up hits on the Canadian country singles chart, including the top 25 "Maybe She'll Change Her Mind", and their duet with Suzanne Gitzi, "I Don't Wanna Know."

In 2002, Ken decided to retire from the music business to pursue other interests. Before the duo disbanded in 2001, Warner Music Canada released The Johner Brothers' Greatest Hits. The album included 16 of the Johner's biggest hits from their 11-year career, along with one new track, "Good Ol' Days." Brad continues to maintain a successful solo career in Canada.

Discography

Albums

Singles

Music videos

Awards and nominations

See also
Brad Johner

References

External links
 Brad Johner's Official Site

Musical groups established in 1988
Musical groups disestablished in 2001
Musical groups from Saskatchewan
Canadian country music groups
1988 establishments in Saskatchewan
2001 disestablishments in Canada
Canadian Country Music Association Duo of the Year winners